Joshua Frederick Cockey Talbott (July 29, 1843 – October 5, 1918) was a U.S. Congressman who represented the second Congressional district of Maryland.

Biography
He was born near Lutherville, Maryland on July 29, 1843. He began to study law in 1862 but joined the Confederate Army during the American Civil War in 1864 to serve in the Second Maryland Cavalry. Following the war, Talbott was admitted to the bar in 1866 and began to practice law in Towson, Maryland.

In 1878, after several years of activity in Democratic politics and local civic affairs, he was elected to the U.S. Congress.  Except for the periods 1885 to 1893, during which he served for a time as Insurance Commissioner for Maryland, and 1894 to 1902, he served in Congress until his death. Talbott was a member of the House Naval Affairs Committee for 25 years and worked unceasingly for a strong and modern Navy.

He died in Lutherville on October 5, 1918, and is interred in Sherwood Cemetery of Cockeysville, Maryland.

Namesake
The destroyer  was named for him.

See also
List of United States Congress members who died in office (1900–49)

References

 Retrieved on 2008-10-18
 Death of Hon. Joshua F.C. Talbott, frontispiece 1919

1843 births
1918 deaths
Confederate States Army soldiers
Democratic Party members of the United States House of Representatives from Maryland
People from Lutherville, Maryland
19th-century American politicians
20th-century American politicians
People of Maryland in the American Civil War
Maryland lawyers
19th-century American lawyers